Sanseongsan is a mountain of Jeollanam-do, southwestern South Korea. It has an elevation of 603 metres.

See also
List of mountains of Korea

References

Damyang County
Mountains of South Jeolla Province
Sunchang County